Atharvan (an n-stem with nominative singular   ) is a legendary Vedic sage (rishi) of Hinduism, who along with Angiras, is supposed to have authored ("heard") the Atharvaveda. He is also said to have first instituted the fire-sacrifice or yajña. Sometimes he is also reckoned among the seven seers, the Saptarishi. His clan is known as the Atharvanas. Atharvan married Shanti, daughter of Prajapati Kardama, and had a great sage Dadhichi as a son. He is referred to as a member of the Bhrigu clan.

According to the Mundaka Upanishad and other texts, he was the eldest son and (Manasaputra) born from mind of the creator deity, Brahma.

Etymology 
Vedic atharvan is cognate with Avestan āθrauuan / aθaurun, "priest", but the etymology of the term is not yet conclusively established. It was once thought to be etymologically related to the Avestan ātar, but that is now considered unlikely (Boyce, 2002:16). It has been suggested by scholars that the Vedic and Avestan terms are not of Indo-European origin, and are derived from the BMAC substrate.

See also
Vedic priesthood
Dadhichi
Manasaputra

References
Boyce, Mary (2002). "Āθravan". Encyclopaedia Iranica. New York: Mazda Pub. pp. 16–17. Available online at http://www.iranicaonline.org/articles/atravan-priest (accessed on 30 December 2012).

Witzel, Michael (2003). "Linguistic Evidence for Cultural Exchange in Prehistoric Western Central Asia". Sino-Platonic Papers Volume 129. Philadelphia: University of Pennsylvania, Department of East Asian Languages and Civilizations.

Rishis

Hindu mythology